Cerball (modern spelling: Cearbhall) is an Irish language male given name and may refer to:

 Cerball mac Dúnlainge (died 888), King of Osraige
 Cerball mac Muirecáin (died 909), King of Leinster
 Cearbhall Óg Ó Dálaigh (floruit 1630), poet
 Cearbhall Ó Dálaigh (1911–1978), President of Ireland

See also
List of Irish-language given names